Mary M. Duggan (March 22, 1921 – March 6, 2009) was an American children's book author.

She was born in 1921 in Belleview, Missouri. Her father was a teacher and local government official. She attended the University of Arizona. On March 13, 1941, she married M. P. Turney, a mining engineer. She had one daughter with him. They later divorced, and, on May 9, 1946, she married Auty W. Duggan, with whom she had three daughters. She was a member of the Church of Scientology.

She was an artist, including water colors, and an author. Her works include Old Hawk's Gold, published by Steck in 1966.

References

1921 births
People from Iron County, Missouri
University of Arizona alumni
American children's writers
American Scientologists
2009 deaths